George W. Stearns High School  (commonly Stearns High School or SHS) is a coeducational public secondary school in Millinocket, Maine, United States, and is part of the Millinocket School Department.  It serves students in grades 6–12. The school is accredited by the New England Association of Schools and Colleges.

History
In the 1970s the school had about 700 students.

As of the 2007-08 school year, the school had an enrollment of 326 students and had 27.9 classroom teachers (on an FTE basis), for a student-teacher ratio of 11.7.

International student program and Global Times controversy
By 2010 the enrollment had declined to about 200, and the school began experiencing budget shortfalls, prompting the school district administration to attempt to recruit international students. The school planned to have 25, and later, 60 international students. Kenneth Smith, the superintendent, planned the international student recruitment. The school district planned to charge $24,000 per student per year. It planned to use all of the Katahdin Inn as a dormitory for the students.

In June 2011 Patrick Mattimore, an adjunct instructor at Tsinghua/Temple Law School, wrote a negative editorial in the Chinese Communist Party tabloid Global Times about the school. Mattimore stated that a New York Times article provided the background information and that the editors of the Global Times had removed his credits to the NYT; Mattimore stated in a guest column for the Bangor Daily News "I wish the background had been credited." In response to his critics, Mattimore wrote in the column that the article tone was "a little more “Mattimore versus Millinocket” than I would have liked" because some of his material about unethical recruiters for U.S. universities and high schools had been removed, and Mattimore stated that he planned to visit Millinocket to clarify the situation.

Adam Minter, a U.S. journalist, asked Kenneth Smith and Eugene Conlogue, the town manager of Millinocket, to provide defenses against the Global Times article, and Minter posted a criticism and rebuttal of the Mattimore article. Kenneth Smith accused Mattimore of having "suspect" credentials. Max Fisher of The Atlantic accused the article of being a propaganda piece to discourage Chinese from sending their children to U.S. high schools.

After the Global Times incident, a recruiter who stated plans to provide 60 students for Stearns ultimately did not provide students. The school only had six international students for the 2011-2012 school year. The district stated that it would continue to do the international student program.

Academics
In 2007, the percentage of 11th grade students meeting the reading proficiency standard was 32%, and meeting the math standard was 21%. Based on these results, it has received a GreatSchools rating of 3 out of 10.

The University of Maine offers support from The Bartley Family Scholarship Fund  to a graduate of the high school majoring in English or forestry.

Extracurricular activities

Athletics
Their teams are known as The Minutemen, and The Lady Minutemen. The school colors are royal  blue  and white.  The complete list of sports offered are:
Football (Fall)
Softball (Fall)
Boys' and girls' basketball (Winter)
Baseball (Spring)
Field hockey (Spring)

Some students from Schenck High School in East Millinocket play in the Stearns football Some Stearns students play sports at Schenck as well, soccer (men's and women's) in the Fall, and tennis in the Spring. Former Stearns basketball coach, George Wentworth, was inducted, posthumously, into the New England Basketball Hall of Fame.  Coach Wentworth's record while coaching Stearns High School was 478 wins to 153 losses.  During the 31 years that Wentworth was the coach, Stearns won six Eastern Maine, four State, and one New England title, and got the first glass backboards in the state.

Unified Performing Arts
Activities in the Unified Performing Arts Department are:
Concert band
Jazz band
Pep band
Chorus
Show choir
Fall musical
One act play

The Show Choir at Stearns is combined with the Show Choir at Schenck High School in East Millinocket, Maine as Unified Harmony. Together they won a state championship and the best choreography award in 2007, 2010, and 2011. They are also combined in Jazz Band, Pep Band, One Act, and Fall Musical. In One Act, they won 2nd place in the state behind Lisbon High School in 2019.

References

External links

Educational institutions established in 1963
Millinocket, Maine
Schools in Penobscot County, Maine
Public high schools in Maine
1963 establishments in Maine